Madonna and Child is a late 1480s painting by Giovanni Bellini, now in the Metropolitan Museum of Art in New York

Unusually, the Madonna holds the viewer's attention with her gaze. The backdrop curtain is pulled slightly open to reveal a distant landscape showing a transition from barren hills to a verdant townscape, a metaphor for resurrection.

References 

1480s paintings
New York
Paintings in the collection of the Metropolitan Museum of Art